Europcar Mobility Group is a French car rental company founded in 1949 in Paris. The head office of the holding company, Europcar Group S.A., is in the business park of Val Saint-Quentin at Voisins-le-Bretonneux (Saint Quentin en Yvelines), France.

Today, Europcar operates in 140 countries covering Europe, North America, Western Asia, and Africa. Since July 2022, Europcar has been owned by Green Mobility Holding, S,A. a consortium led by the Volkswagen Group, Attestor and Pon Holdings. Keddy is the Europcar leisure rental sub-brand.

History

Early stages 
Europcar Mobility Group was founded in 1949 in Paris by Raoul-Louis Mattei under the name of "The Automobile Subscription". The "Europcars" brand was created in 1951. After 20 years of growth, the company was then owned from 1970 to 1988 by Renault, the Compagnie Internationale des Wagons-Lits and Accor.

Volkswagen subsidiary 
From 1998, Europcar had progressively been acquired by the Volkswagen Group, until it eventually became a subsidiary 100% owned by the carmaker in 1999.

Buy-back by Eurazeo 
In 2006, Eurazeo, the investment company, bought Europcar from the Volkswagen Group. The amount of the transaction was worth 2.4 times Europcar's turnover in 2005. The chairman of the Board of Eurazeo, Patrick Sayer, said: "We are thrilled by the acquisition of Europcar. With an initial participation of 900 million euros, it is due to become of the most significant investments for Eurazeo."

In 2010, the group partnered with Daimler to launch the Car2Go service in Hamburg, Germany.

Philippe Germond, who had been CEO of PMU since 2009, was named CEO of Europcar from October 1, 2015.

In January 2015, Europcar acquired Ubeeqo, a startup that specialises in corporate carsharing.

In May 2015, Europcar announced its intention to go public.

In early 2017, the company announced a trio of acquisitions: Milan based GuidaMi, Europcar Denmark and Germany based Buchbinder.

In December 2017, the company completed its acquisition of low-cost car rental company, Goldcar, for an enterprise value of €550 million ($616 million).

In April 2018, Europcar acquired Scooty, through Ubeeqo, a Belgian start-up that specialises in electric scooter-sharing in Antwerp and Brussels.

In August 2019, Europcar acquired Fox Rent A Car, one of the largest independent players in the US car rental market.

Recent 
On 28 July 2021, Green Mobility Holding, which is a consortium led by the Volkswagen Group, Attestor and Pon Holdings, announced that the consortium would acquire Europcar Mobility Group, and the transaction closed in June 2022.

Corporate affairs 
Europcar's head office was formerly in the Immeuble Les Quadrants in Saint Quentin en Yvelines, France.

Commitments

Sport sponsorships 
Europcar began sponsoring sport teams in 1980. The group sponsored a Formula One Renault team and the Paris-Dakar rally. The company was also involved in other sports such as golf, horse racing and marathons.

Europcar has sponsored 2009 ICC Champions Trophy organised by ICC which was held in South Africa, although it was not a major sponsor.

Since 2011, Europcar has been sponsoring the French professional road cycling team managed by Jean-René Bernaudeau, names after the brand: Team Europcar. The group received the "Sponsor of the year" title for its involvement in cycling, awarded by Sporsora.

In August 2014, Arsenal F.C. announced that Europcar UK had become the club's official car and van rental partner over a three-year deal.

Corporate citizenship 
Europcar joined the United Nations Global Compact in 2005 and adopted the ten fundamental principles of the pact.

The company is invested in the "Green Charter" programme, certified by Bureau Veritas and is also a partner of WeForest, an international non-profit organisation whose goal is to foster reforestation.

Legal
In June 2014, the Australian Federal Court ruled that a Europcar franchisee (now corporate owned) in Tasmania had "engaged in unconscionable conduct and made false or misleading representations when charging customers for damage to hire vehicles" and fined the former franchisee owner $264,000.

On 23 June 2017 the company's head offices in England were raided by Leicester Trading Standards and a case referred to the Serious Fraud Office due to accusations of overcharging customers for repairing damage to hire vehicles.

References

External links 

 Europcar Car Rental

Companies based in Paris-Saclay
Companies formerly listed on the Paris Bourse
Car rental companies of France
French brands
Retail companies established in 1949
Transport companies established in 1949
French companies established in 1949
2022 mergers and acquisitions